General Brandt may refer to:

Heinz Brandt (1907–1944), German Wehrmacht officer posthumously promoted to major general
Jürgen Brandt (1922–2003), German Bundeswehr general
Karl Brandt (1904–1948), German Waffen-SS major general
Michael G. Brandt (fl. 1970s–1990s), Missouri Air National Guard brigadier general

See also
Heinrich von Brandt (1789–1868), Prussian general